Aiguo Subdistrict  is a township-level division situated in Xiashan District of Zhanjiang, Guangdong, China. , it administers Techeng Village and the following five residential neighborhoods:
Huanhu Community
Renmindong Community
Hongwu Community
Dongdi Community
Hankou Community

See also
List of township-level divisions of Guangdong

References

Township-level divisions of Guangdong
Zhanjiang